Omri Kende (born 6 July 1986 in Israel) is a former Israeli footballer who plays as a defender for.

Honours
Israeli Championships (1):
2009-10
State Cup (3):
2010, 2011, 2012

References

1986 births
Living people
Israeli footballers
Israeli Jews
Association football midfielders
Hapoel Tel Aviv F.C. players
Hapoel Petah Tikva F.C. players
FC Astra Giurgiu players
Hapoel Haifa F.C. players
Maccabi Netanya F.C. players
Hapoel Jerusalem F.C. players
Liga Leumit players
Israeli Premier League players
Liga I players
Israel under-21 international footballers
Israeli people of Slovak-Jewish descent
Israeli expatriate footballers
Expatriate footballers in Romania
Israeli expatriate sportspeople in Romania
Footballers from Ramat Gan